Arthur Samuel Atkinson (20 October 1833 – 10 December 1902) was a 19th-century Member of Parliament from the Taranaki Region, New Zealand.

Biography

He was a brother of Premier Harry Atkinson, and part of the Richmond–Atkinson family. He married Jane Maria Richmond in 1854.

He later moved to Nelson, and became a lawyer. He studied Māori people, languages and natural sciences. He died at Fairfield, the house that he had built in 1872.

References

1833 births
1902 deaths
New Zealand MPs for North Island electorates
Members of the New Zealand House of Representatives
Atkinson–Hursthouse–Richmond family
19th-century New Zealand politicians
19th-century New Zealand lawyers
New Zealand naturalists
Fell family